Kissousa is a small village in the Limassol District of Cyprus, located 2 km south of Malia.

References

Communities in Limassol District